The First Day is the first of three collaborations between British musicians David Sylvian and Robert Fripp. It was released in August 1993, featuring a driving rock style with elements of funk.

After scattered collaborations from the late 1980s, Fripp asked Sylvian to join a new version of his band King Crimson, but Sylvian proposed a collaborative album.

All vocals and guitar parts were recorded at Kingsway in New Orleans, and the mixing was carried out at Electric Ladyland in New York with the help of Peter Gabriel's engineer David Bottrill. They also recorded in Woodstock. Chapman stick player Trey Gunn provided a foundation for Fripp to experiment on electric guitar. Percussion duties were filled by Marc Anderson (longtime collaborator with Steve Tibbetts) and Jerry Marotta (drummer for Peter Gabriel and Tony Levin), while co-producer David Bottrill provided percussion treatments and samples.

The First Day was released in three versions: a double LP (V2712), a regular CD (CDV 2712) and a box set with eight photo prints (CDVX 2712).

Jean the Birdman was released as a single, featuring exclusive B-sides not available on an album.

Impact 
"Bringing Down the Light" appeared in the Chris Morris TV series Jam.

Background 

Sylvian said in an interview 1994 about the album:

Track listing
All songs by David Sylvian (music & lyrics), Robert Fripp (music), and Trey Gunn (music), except where noted.

"God's Monkey" (David Bottrill, Fripp, Gunn, Sylvian) – 4:58
"Jean the Birdman" – 4:09
"Firepower" – 10:25
"Brightness Falls" – 6:05
"20th Century Dreaming (A Shaman's Song)" – 11:50
"Darshan (The Road to Graceland)" (Bottrill, Fripp, Gunn, Sylvian) – 17:17
"Bringing Down the Light" (Fripp) – 8:31

Personnel and production
 David Sylvian – vocals, guitars, keyboard instruments, tapes
 Robert Fripp – guitar, Frippertronics
 Trey Gunn – chapman stick, vocals
 Jerry Marotta – drums, percussion instruments
 Marc Anderson – percussion
 David Bottrill – treatments, sampled percussion, computer programming, engineer
 Ingrid Chavez – vocals

Additional personnel
Richard Chadwick – recording co-ordination
Natasha White – recording co-ordination assistant
Dan McLoughlin, John Yates, Mark Glass, Trina Shoemaker – assistant engineers
Catherine McRae – design co-ordination
Kevin Westenberg – photography
Dave Coppenhall, Vaughan Oliver – design
John Sinks – technical and strategic Liaison

References

David Sylvian albums
Robert Fripp albums
1993 albums
Albums produced by David Bottrill
Virgin Records albums
Collaborative albums